Eumenes II Soter (ruled 197–159 BC) was a ruler of Pergamon, and a son of Attalus I Soter and queen Apollonis and a member of the Attalid dynasty of Pergamon.

Biography
The eldest son of king Attalus I and queen Apollonis, Eumenes was presumably born prior to 220 BC and was the eldest of four sons to Attalus I. Eumenes followed in his father's footsteps upon becoming king and collaborated with the Romans to oppose first Macedonian, then Seleucid expansion towards the Aegean, leading to the defeat of Antiochus the Great at the Battle of Magnesia in 190 BC.

He had refused to marry a daughter of Antiochus III upon noticing that he was about to engage in a war against the Romans.
He then had married Stratonice of Pergamon, daughter of Ariarathes IV (King of Cappadocia) and his wife Antiochis, and their son was named Attalus III.

Expansion of the kingdom

Eumenes had followed his father's footsteps and aided the Romans whenever he could, firstly in the Roman-Seleucid War, where he both informed them by sending his brother Attalus II and sided with the Romans, successfully aiding Rome in defeating Antiochus III in the Battle of Magnesia. He then aided the Romans in the War against Nabis where he aided both the Aetolian and Achaean leagues to defeat the Spartan tyrant Nabis, and lastly in the Third Macedonian War where he aided the Romans in defeating the Macedonian and Thracian army in the Battle of Pydna against Perseus of Macedon. He was then at war with the Bithynian king Prusias I in 183 BC, although being defeated, he received Roman support which ended in his victory.

Following the Peace of Apamea in 188 BC, he received the regions of Phrygia, Lydia, Pisidia, Pamphylia, and parts of Lycia from his Roman allies. By dividing Asia Minor between their allies Rhodes and Pergamon the Romans made sure that neither state would be able to become too powerful in the region. The Romans also managed to ensure that Rome would remain involved in the affairs of the region.

Falling out of favour with the Romans
He later fell out of favour with the Romans after they suspected him of conspiring with Perseus of Macedon. In order to avert suspicion, he sent his congratulations to Rome by his brother Attalus II after the defeat of Perseus. Attalus was received courteously, and in 167 BC the Romans made an abortive attempt to install Attalus on the Pergamene throne. Eumenes in alarm set out to visit Rome in person to plead his case, but on his arrival at Brundusium (Brindisi) was ordered to leave Italy at once. In the event, the ties of kinship proved strong, and Eumenes remained as ruler. He also warred with Pharnaces I, who attempted to enlist the aid of the Seleucids, under Seleucus IV but due to the peace of Apamea, denied siding with him. Later on, in around 179 BC, after suffering losses, Pharnaces sued for peace.

When Eumenes' health began to weaken his brother Attalus II ascended to the throne as a co-ruler in 160 BC. Since Eumenes' and Stratonice's son was still a minor, the throne was assumed by Attalus, who also married Eumenes' widow Stratonice in 158 BC upon becoming king.

Legacy

Eumenes II was a shrewd ruler and politician, who raised his state to a powerful monarchy. During his reign Pergamum became a flourishing city, where men of learning were always welcome, among them Crates of Mallus, the founder of the Pergamene school of criticism. Eumenes adorned the city with splendid buildings, amongst them the great altar with the frieze representing the Battle of the Giants. His great achievement was the expansion of the Library at Pergamon, one of the great libraries of the Ancient World and the place traditionally associated with the creation of parchment, although it had existed for centuries. He also built a stoa on the Athenian acropolis.

Notes

References
Hansen, Esther V. (1971). The Attalids of Pergamon. Ithaca, New York: Cornell University Press; London: Cornell University Press Ltd. .
Kosmetatou, Elizabeth (2003) "The Attalids of Pergamon," in Andrew Erskine, ed., A Companion to the Hellenistic World. Oxford: Blackwell: pp. 159–174. . text
 Polybius, Histories, Evelyn S. Shuckburgh (translator); London, New York. Macmillan (1889); Reprint Bloomington (1962). Online version at the Perseus Digital Library

Kings of Pergamon
2nd-century BC Greek people
2nd-century BC rulers in Asia
Ancient Greek generals
Year of birth unknown
159 BC deaths